The 1975 Utah Utes football team was an American football team that represented the University of Utah as a member of the Western Athletic Conference (WAC) during the 1975 NCAA Division I football season. In their second season under head coach Tom Lovat, the Utes compiled an overall record of 1–10 with a mark of 1–4 against conference opponents, placing sixth in the WAC. Home games were played on campus at Robert Rice Stadium in Salt Lake City.

Schedule

NFL Draft
One Ute was selected in the 1976 NFL Draft, which lasted 17 rounds (487 selections).

References

External links
 Official game program: Washington State at Utah – September 20, 1975

Utah
Utah Utes football seasons
Utah Utes football